Silver Creek is an unincorporated community and census-designated place (CDP) in Silver Creek Township, Wright County, Minnesota, United States. As of the 2010 census, its population was 256.  The community is on Wright County Road 8 near 112th Street NW. Wright County Road 39 is nearby.

Nearby places include Maple Lake, Annandale, Clearwater, Hasty, Monticello, and Lake Maria State Park.

Silver Creek is six miles north of Maple Lake and 21 miles south of St. Cloud.

The community has a post office with ZIP code 55380.

Demographics

References

Census-designated places in Wright County, Minnesota
Census-designated places in Minnesota
Unincorporated communities in Wright County, Minnesota
Unincorporated communities in Minnesota